Tung Wan Beach may refer to the following beaches in Hong Kong:

 Cheung Chau Tung Wan Beach, a gazetted beach in Cheung Chau
 Ma Wan Tung Wan Beach, a gazetted beach in Ma Wan